Faro Cathedral  is a Roman Catholic cathedral in Faro, Portugal. The cathedral was consecrated in the name of the Blessed Virgin Mary in the late 13th century by the Archbishop of Braga. It has been the seat of the Diocese of Faro since 1540, replacing Silves Cathedral on the orders of King John III of Portugal. In 1596 the church was destroyed by the Earl of Essex. The cathedral is a National Monument of Portugal.

History
The cathedral premises seems to have a long history of sacredness even though archaeological evidences have not been found. According to tradition, an early Paleo-Christian basilica was built here and it was later transformed into a mosque during the Arab Moorish rule. The mosque was finally converted into a Christian church after the Reconquesta of the city by D. Afonso III in 1249. A mother church was rebuilt here soon after. The origins of the present Cathedral are identified to the middle of the 13th century.

References

Faro
National monuments in Faro District
Buildings and structures in Faro, Portugal
Churches in Faro District
Former mosques in Portugal